The 2013–14 CEV Champions League was the 55th edition of the highest level European volleyball club competition organised by the European Volleyball Confederation.

Participating teams

League round
28 teams have been drawn to 7 pools of 4 teams each.

In each pool, the competition is organised on the basis of a double round-robin system. Each team will thus play 6 matches: twice against each opponent.

Points are awarded as follows:
3 points for a 3:0 or 3:1 victory;
2 points for a 3:2 victory;
1 point for a 2:3 defeat;
0 points for a 1:3 or 0:3 defeat.

In case two or more teams finish with an equal number of points, they will be ranked on the basis of the following criteria:
number of matches won;
set quotient (the number of total sets won divided by the number of total sets lost);
points quotient (the number of total points scored divided by the number of total points lost);
results of head-to-head matches between the teams in question.

12 teams will qualify for the Playoff 12:
the winner of each pool, and
5 second-ranked teams with the best score.

After the end of the League Round, the organizer of the Final Four will be determined. That team will qualify directly for the Final Four. It will be replaced in Playoff 12 by the next best second-ranked team.

The remaining second-ranked team as well 3 third-ranked teams with the best score will move to the Challenge Round of the CEV Cup.

The remaining third-ranked and all fourth-ranked teams will be eliminated.

All times are local.

Pool A

|}

|}

Pool B

 
|}

|}

Pool C

|}

|}

Pool D

|}

|}

Pool E

|}

|}

Pool F

|}

|}

Pool G

|}

|}

Playoffs
The playoffs will consist of two rounds: Playoff 12 and Playoff 6. These will be played between 14 January and 13 February 2014. Each round is played in two legs.

If the teams are tied after two legs, a "Golden Set" is played. The winner is the team that first obtains 15 points, provided that the points difference between the two teams is at least 2 points (thus, the Golden Set is similar to a tiebreak set in a normal match).

At each leg, points are awarded to the teams in the same manner as in the Group Round (3 for 3:0 or 3:1, 2 for 3:2 etc.). So, if team A defeat team B in the first leg 3:0 and lose in the second leg 1:3, team A does not advance to the next round (as it would have been expected on the basis of analogy with football competitions), but the two teams are tied with 3 points each, and a Golden Set is played.

The three teams that win in Playoff 6 round advance to the Final Four.

All times are local.

Playoff 12

|}

First leg

|}

Second leg

   
|}

Playoff 6

|}

First leg

|}

Second leg

|}

Final Four
Organizer:  Halkbank Ankara
 Place: Ankara
All times are Eastern European Time (UTC+02:00).

Semifinals

|}

3rd place match

|}

Final

|}

Final standings

Awards

Most Valuable Player
  Sergey Tetyukhin (Belogorie Belgorod)
Best Scorer
  Michał Łasko (Jastrzębski Węgiel)
Best Spiker
  Maxim Mikhaylov (Zenit Kazan)
Best Server
  Emre Batur (Halkbank Ankara)

Best Blocker
  Dmitry Muserskiy (Belogorie Belgorod)
Best Receiver
  Matey Kaziyski (Halkbank Ankara)
Best Libero
  Damian Wojtaszek (Jastrzębski Węgiel)
Best Setter
  Raphael Oliveira (Halkbank Ankara)

External links
 2014 CEV DenizBank Volleyball Champions League

CEV Champions League
2013 in volleyball
2014 in volleyball